Elisha Bartlett (October 6, 1804 – July 19, 1855) was a medical doctor, professor and poet who served in the Massachusetts House of Representatives and as the first mayor of Lowell, Massachusetts.

Medical professor
Elisha Bartlett was born in Smithfield, Rhode Island, and was educated in Smithfield, Uxbridge, and a friend's school in New York. After studying medicine under the mentorship of Dr. Willard of Uxbridge, Dr. Green and Dr. Heywood of Worcester, and Dr. Levi Wheaton of Providence, he earned an M.D. degree at Brown Medical School in 1826. Beginning with his appointment as Professor of Pathological Anatomy and Materia Medica at the Berkshire Medical College in Pittsfield, Massachusetts, in 1832, Bartlett taught at a number of medical schools, including Transylvania University, the University of Maryland School of Medicine, Vermont Medical College, Woodstock, Vermont, the University of Louisville, where he was Professor of the Theory and Practice of Medicine, the University of the City of New York, and the College of Physicians and Surgeons in New York City, where he was Chair of Materia Medica and Medical Jurisprudence. He was elected a Fellow of the American Academy of Arts and Sciences in 1845.

First Mayor of Lowell
After graduating from Brown in 1826 and brief study in Paris, Bartlett married Elizabeth Slater, also of Smithfield, and in 1827 settled in Lowell, Massachusetts.  Except for his tenure at Berkshire Medical College, he remained in Lowell throughout the 1830s. In April, 1836, Lowell received its city charter from the Commonwealth of Massachusetts, and in October, 1836, Bartlett was elected as the city's first mayor.  Running as a Whig, he defeated Democrat Eliphalet Case 958–868 for a one-year term.  In 1837 he ran for re-election, defeating Case again, by a margin of 1,018-817.

During his tenure he was faced with the challenges of the Lowell Mill Girls strike in 1836, and the Panic of 1837.

Writings
 An Address of the Birth of Spurzheim (1838)
 The history, diagnosis, and treatment of typhoid and of typhus fever, with an essay on the diagnosis of bilious remittent and of yellow fever (1842).
 An sssay on the philosophy of medical science, (1844).
 The history, diagnosis, and treatment of the fevers of the United States, (1847).
 An inquiry into the degree of certainty in medicine: and into the nature and extent of its power over disease, (1848).
 The history, diagnosis, and treatment of edematous laryngitis, (1850).

References

Bibliography

External links
 
 Huth, E.J.: Elisha Bartlett (1804–1855), an American disciple of Jules Gavarret, (2006). In: The James Lind Library (www.jameslindlibrary.org). Accessed Tuesday July 13, 2010.
 Huntington, Elisha: An address on the life, character and writings of Elisha Bartlett, M.D., (1856). From The Digital Collections of the National Library of Medicine.
 Elisha Bartlett Family Papers, D.96, Rare Books, Special Collections, and Preservation, River Campus Libraries, University of Rochester.

1804 births
1855 deaths
Physicians from Massachusetts
Alpert Medical School alumni
Fellows of the American Academy of Arts and Sciences
Mayors of Lowell, Massachusetts
Members of the Massachusetts House of Representatives
University of Louisville faculty
University of Maryland, Baltimore faculty
19th-century American politicians